A registered share is a stock that is registered to the name of the exact owner. If the owner of such a share sells their share, the new owner must register with their name and other personal information such as address and birthdate.

Registered shares offer the issuer the advantage of always knowing who exactly their shareholders are. Surprises with active investors could be prohibited with this stock-vehicle.

See also
Book-entry
Dematerialization (securities)
Insider trading
Stock transfer agent

References

Stock market
Equity securities

ja:種類株式#譲渡制限規定(4号)